Hong Kong Sea Cadet Corps is a youth organization based in Hong Kong and formed in 1968 by former Royal Naval Reserve officers by the creation of Hong Kong Law (Hong Kong Sea Cadet Corps Ordinance)

The HKSCC was linked to British Armed Forces' Combined Cadet Force and Sea Cadet Corps. Since the handover in 1997, the HKSCC is mostly a government funded organisation and does not have any links to the People's Liberation Army Navy. It also receives financial support from Hong Kong Jockey Club and The Community Chest of Hong Kong.

Based at Diamond Hill, Kowloon, the 1800-strong HKSCC has 32 training units and two nautical centres (Stanley Bay and Sai Kung).

Rank & Rates

HKSCC adopts the ranking system from the Royal Navy and their Sea Cadets program:

Uniform

Officers, instructors and cadets wear dark navy berets (peaked, white caps for the instructors and officers), blue shirts, dark navy blue trousers and black boots named the Action Working Dress (AWD) during routine trainings. Its equivalent is the No.4AWD worn across the Royal Navy.

On occasions of ceremonial duties, parades or other public events they will wear white (No.6) or blue (No.1) dress uniforms in summer and winter respectively, similar to the Royal Navy uniform worn by officers, senior and junior rates.

Source: Uniforms of the Hong Kong Sea Cadet Corps

Weapons

The Hong Kong Sea Cadet Corps Ceremonial Guard parade out with the replica Enfield L85A1/ (known as SA80 in Royal Navy) rifle.

In the past, they drilled with the Lee-Enfield L59A1 Drill Rifle but rarely do so today.

Facilities

Training Ships or TS are land base training units for the HKSCC around the territory. Some are named after Her Majesty's Ships of the Royal Navy.

 TS Ark Royal - named after HMS Ark Royal
 TS Brilliant - named after HMS Brilliant
 TS Cornflower - named after HMS Cornflower
 TS Drake - named after HMS Drake
 TS Eternity
 TS Hero - named after HMS Hero
 TS King Ling
 TS Lightning - named after HMS Lightning
 TS Ma Ko Pan
 TS Mountbatten - named after Lord Louis Mountbatten, Former First Sea Lord of the Royal Navy
 TS Nelson - named after HMS Nelson / Admiral Lord Horatio Nelson
 TS Neptune - named after HMS Neptune
 TS Royalist - named after HMS Royalist
 TS Somerset - named after HMS Somerset
 TS Unicorn - named after HMS Unicorn
 TS York - named after HMS York

Training Centres
 Administration Headquarters, Diamond Hill, Kowloon
 Jubilee Centre, Stanley, Hong Kong Island
 Tang Shiu Kin Nautical Centre, Sai Kung, New Territories

Training Launch
 Supertee

Disbanded Units
 TS Anson - named after HMS Anson
 TS Collingwood - named after HMS Collingwood
 TS Courageous - named after HMS Courageous
 TS Chatham - named after HMS Chatham
 TS Rodney - named after HMS Rodney
 TS Swallow - named after HMS Swallow (P242)
 TS Talent - named after HMS Talent
 TS Victory - named after HMS Victory
 TS Zulu - named after HMS Zulu

Awards

Hong Kong Sea Cadet Corps issues their own awards to their members and are not part of the government issued Orders, decorations, and medals of Hong Kong. The medals and clasps are modelled after the ones awarded by the United Kingdom Ministry of Defence:

 Outstanding Cadet(s) of the Year
 Best Unit of the Year
 Cadet Force Medal (before 1997)
 Hong Kong Sea Cadet Force Medal

See also

 Hong Kong Adventure Corps
 Hong Kong Air Cadet Corps

References

External links

Hong Kong Sea Cadet Corps Official Website
TS Brilliant (HKSCC)
TS Ark Royal (HKSCC)
TS Lightning (HKSCC)

Youth organisations based in Hong Kong
Naval Cadet organisations
Military of Hong Kong under British rule